The Jean Sawyer Trophy is awarded annually to the top marketing director(s) in the Quebec Major Junior Hockey League. The trophy was previously known as the St-Clair Group Plaque from 1990 to 2002.

Winners

External links
 QMJHL official site List of trophy winners.

Quebec Major Junior Hockey League trophies and awards